Shuangbo Town is a town and the county seat in the west central Shuangpai County, Hunan, China. Its seat is at Dalukou Village.

References

Shuangpai
County seats in Hunan